Micromedetera is a genus of fly in the family Dolichopodidae from the Neotropical realm.

Species
Micromedetera archboldi Robinson, 1975 – Dominica
Micromedetera shannoni Robinson, 1975 – Panama
Micromedetera wirthi Robinson, 1975 – Jamaica

References

Medeterinae
Dolichopodidae genera
Diptera of North America
Taxa named by Harold E. Robinson